No Regret may refer to:

 No Regret (album), a 2000 album by Lonnie Gordon
 No Regret (film), a 2006 South Korean film
 "No Regret" (song), a 2006 song by Kumi Koda
 No Regret (1986 film), a South Korean film starring Nam Koong Won
 No Regret (1987 film), a Hong Kong film starring Carol Yeung Ling
 Crusader: No Regret, a 1996 action computer game

See also 
 No Regret Life, a Japanese rock band
 No Regrets (disambiguation)